Hong Ah-reum (born March 28, 1989) is a South Korean actress. Hong made her entertainment debut in 2006 through a MapleStory commercial, then launched her acting career. She has made herself known as one of the most familiar faces in Korean telenovela by headlining several titles of the genre such as Reversal of Fate, A Bird That Doesn't Sing, and two of KBS TV Novel series Samsaengi and Dal Soon's Spring.

Filmography

Television series

Film

Music video

Awards and nominations

References

External links
 
 
 

1989 births
Living people
South Korean television actresses
South Korean film actresses
21st-century South Korean actresses
Actresses from Seoul
Seoul Institute of the Arts alumni